This is a list of States and Union Territories of India by speakers of Kannada as of census 2001. Gross population figures are available online.

References

Lists of states of India by number of speakers of the languages
Kannada language